Vilayannur is a village near Thenkurussi, in the Palakkad district of Kerala, India.

References

Villages in Palakkad district